James George Nicol (born 3 August 1939) is an English drummer and business entrepreneur. He is best known for replacing Ringo Starr in the Beatles for eight concerts of the Beatles' 1964 world tour during the height of Beatlemania, elevating him from relative obscurity to worldwide fame and then back again in the space of a fortnight. Nicol had hoped that his association with the Beatles would greatly enhance his career but instead found that the spotlight moved away from him once Starr returned to the group, and in 1965 his subsequent lack of commercial success culminated in bankruptcy. In 1967, after having worked with a number of different bands which included a successful relationship with the Spotnicks, he left the music business to pursue a variety of entrepreneurial ventures.

Over the decades, Nicol increasingly shied away from media attention, preferring not to discuss his connection to the Beatles nor seeking financial gain from it. He has a son, Howard, who is a BAFTA award-winning sound engineer.

Early career
Parnes invited Nicol to join Colin Hicks & The Cabin Boys whom Parnes co-managed with John Kennedy (Colin Hicks is the younger brother of English entertainer Tommy Steele, whom Parnes also managed). After taking a temporary break from the group to be a member of the original pit band in the Lionel Bart musical Fings Ain't Wot They Used T'Be at the Theatre Royal Stratford East Nicol rejoined Hicks's band for their appearance in the 1958 Italian film documentary Europa Di Notte, breaking them in Italy and subsequently allowing them to tour there extensively. During the early sixties, Nicol went on to play for a number of artists, including Vince Eager, Oscar Rabin, and Cyril Stapleton and was kept in regular work through Charlie Katz, a well-known session fixer during that period. Nicol has cited drummer Phil Seamen and saxophonist Julian "Cannonball" Adderley as being his main influences.

In 1964 Nicol helped to form The Shubdubs with former Merseybeats bassist Bob Garner, a jazz line-up similar in musical style to Georgie Fame and the Blue Flames, a group with whom Nicol had sat-in when they were the resident house band at London's now defunct Flamingo Jazz Club. Other members of The Shubdubs were Tony Allen (vocals), Johnny Harris (trumpet), Quincy Davis (tenor saxophone), and Roger Coulam (organ – went on to form Blue Mink). It was at this point that he received a telephone call from the Beatles' producer, George Martin. Nicol recalled: "I was having a bit of a lie down after lunch when the phone rang."

With the Beatles

When Ringo Starr became ill with tonsillitis and was hospitalised on 3 June 1964, the eve of the Beatles' 1964 Australasian tour, the band's manager Brian Epstein and their producer George Martin urgently discussed the feasibility of using a stand-in drummer rather than cancelling part of the tour. Martin suggested Jimmie Nicol as he had recently used him on a recording session with Tommy Quickly. Nicol had also drummed on a 'Top Six' budget label album as part of an uncredited session band, as well as an extended play single (with three tracks on each side) of Beatles cover versions (marketed as 'Teenagers Choice' and titled Beatlemania) which meant that he already knew the songs and their arrangements. Producer Bill Wellings and Shubdubs trumpeter Johnny Harris (freelancing as an arranger and composer) were responsible for putting together alternative budget cover versions of songs taken from the British Hit Parade aimed at cash-strapped teenagers. Harris said: "The idea was for me to try and guess which six songs would be topping the charts about a month ahead. I would do the arrangements and then go into the studio and record 'sound a-likes'; the first EP (extended play) released got to number 30 in the charts. Jimmie was on drums and, as you can imagine, we covered a lot of the Beatles' songs."

Although John Lennon and Paul McCartney quickly accepted the idea of using an understudy, George Harrison threatened to pull out of the tour telling Epstein and Martin: "If Ringo's not going, then neither am I. You can find two replacements." Martin recalled: "They nearly didn't do the Australia tour. George is a very loyal person. It took all of Brian's and my persuasion to tell George that if he didn't do it he was letting everybody down." Tony Barrow, who was the Beatles' press officer at the time, later commented: "Brian saw it as the lesser of two evils; cancel the tour and upset thousands of fans or continue and upset the Beatles." Starr stated that "it was very strange, them going off without me. They'd taken Jimmie Nicol and I thought they didn't love me any more – all that stuff went through my head." The arrangements were made very quickly, from a telephone call to Nicol at his home in West London inviting him to attend an audition/rehearsal at Abbey Road Studios, to packing his bags, all in the same day. At a press conference a reporter mischievously asked John Lennon why Pete Best, who had been the Beatles' previous drummer for two years but dismissed by the group on the eve of stardom, was not rehired, to which Lennon replied: "He's got his own group [Pete Best & the All Stars], and it might have looked as if we were taking him back, which is not good for him."

Nicol's first concert with the Beatles took place just 27 hours later on 4 June at the KB Hallen in Copenhagen, Denmark. He was given the distinctive Beatle moptop hairstyle, put on Starr's suit and went on stage to an audience of 4,500 Beatles fans. McCartney recalled: "He was sitting up on this rostrum just eyeing up all the women. We'd start 'She Loves You': [counting in] 'one, two', nothing, 'one, two', and still nothing!" Their set was reduced from eleven songs to ten, dropping Starr's vocal spot of "I Wanna Be Your Man". McCartney teasingly sent Starr a telegram saying: "Hurry up and get well Ringo, Jimmy is wearing out all your suits." Commenting later on the fickle nature of his brief celebrity, Nicol reflected: "The day before I was a Beatle, girls weren't interested in me at all. The day after, with the suit and the Beatle cut, riding in the back of the limo with John and Paul, they were dying to get a touch of me. It was very strange and quite scary." He was also able to shed some light on how they passed the time between shows: "I thought I could drink and lay women with the best of them until I caught up with these guys."

In the Netherlands, Nicol and Lennon allegedly spent a whole night at a brothel. Lennon said: "It was some kind of scene on the road. Satyricon! There's photographs of me grovelling about, crawling about Amsterdam on my knees, coming out of whorehouses, and people saying 'Good morning John'. The police escorted me to these places because they never wanted a big scandal. When we hit town, we hit it – we were not pissing about. We had [the women]. They were great. We didn't call them groupies, then; I've forgotten what we called them, something like 'slags'." Nicol discovered that, aside from acting as a Beatle, he could behave much as any tourist could: "I often went out alone. Hardly anybody recognised me and I was able to wander around. In Hong Kong, I went to see the thousands of people who live on little boats in the harbour. I saw the refugees in Kowloon, and I visited a nightclub. I like to see life. A Beatle could never really do that."

Nicol played a total of eight shows until Starr rejoined the group in Melbourne, Australia, on 14 June. He was unable to say goodbye to the Beatles as they were still asleep when he left, and he did not want to disturb them. At Melbourne Airport, Epstein presented him with a cheque for £500 and a gold Eterna-matic wrist watch inscribed: "From the Beatles and Brian Epstein to Jimmy – with appreciation and gratitude." George Martin later paid tribute to Nicol whilst recognising the problems he experienced in trying to readjust to a normal life again: "Jimmie Nicol was a very good drummer who came along and learnt Ringo's parts very well. He did the job excellently, and faded into obscurity immediately afterwards." Paul McCartney acknowledged: "It wasn't an easy thing for Jimmy to stand in for Ringo, and have all that fame thrust upon him. And the minute his tenure was over, he wasn't famous any more." Nicol himself expressed his disillusionment several years later: "Standing in for Ringo was the worst thing that ever happened to me. Until then I was quite happy earning £30 or £40 a week. After the headlines died, I began dying too." He resisted the temptation to sell his story, stating in a rare 1987 interview: "After the money ran low, I thought of cashing-in in some way or other. But the timing wasn't right. And I didn't want to step on the Beatles' toes. They had been damn good for me and to me."

Later career and life
Nicol reformed the Shubdubs, renaming themselves Jimmy Nicol and the Shubdubs. They released two singles "Husky"/"Don't Come Back", followed by "Humpty Dumpty"/"Night Train"; neither of which was a commercial success. He was later called upon to again stand in for an ailing drummer when Dave Clark of The Dave Clark Five fell ill and Nicol's band, Jimmy Nicol and the Shubdubs, filled in for The Dave Clark Five in Blackpool, Lancashire. Whilst there Nicol was reminded of just how popular, albeit briefly, he had been as a stand-in Beatle; receiving a bundle of 5,000 fan letters passed on to him from an Australian radio disc jockey. Nicol sent a message back thanking the fans, promising that he would one day return to Australia permanently.

He was later reunited with the Beatles when his band appeared on the same bill as them and The Fourmost on 12 July 1964 at the Hippodrome in Brighton.

In 1965, Nicol declared bankruptcy with debts of £4,066, nine months after being a temporary Beatle. After seeing news of Nicol's bankruptcy in the Daily Mirror Paul McCartney recommended him to Peter and Gordon who hired him for a 1965 England tour.

Later that year he joined the successful Swedish group the Spotnicks, recording with them and twice touring the world. He left them in 1967, spending time in Mexico and formed Los Nicolquinn with Eddie Quinn.  An album was released on RCA Records.  He also scored the music for the film El Mes Mas Cruel.

In 1975, he returned to England and became involved with housing renovations.

In 1984, Nicol participated in a Beatles convention in Amsterdam. Four years later, in 1988, rumours of his death began circulating.

Legacy
During Nicol's brief time with the Beatles both Lennon and McCartney would often ask him how he felt he was coping, to which his reply would usually be "It's getting better". Three years later McCartney was walking his dog, Martha, with Hunter Davies, the Beatles official biographer, when the sun came out. McCartney remarked that the weather was "getting better" and began to laugh, remembering Nicol. This event inspired the song "Getting Better" on 1967's Sgt. Pepper's Lonely Hearts Club Band. McCartney again makes reference to Nicol on the Let It Be tapes from 1969, saying: "I think you'll find we're not going abroad 'cause Ringo just said he doesn't want to go abroad. And he put his foot down. So, us and Jimmie Nicol might go abroad."

While appearing on the radio show Fresh Air hosted by Terry Gross in April 2016, Tom Hanks noted that he was at least partly influenced by Jimmie Nicol's experience with the Beatles when he wrote the script for his 1996 feature film That Thing You Do!

Discography and performance history

Information compiled from

See also 

Scot Halpin

References

Bibliography

External links

Biography at feenotes.com

1939 births
English rock drummers
Living people
Musicians from London
The Beatles
English session musicians
British expatriates in Mexico